Nitigius (? - 570-585 - ?) was a medieval Galician clergyman.

References
 Consello da Cultura Galega (ed.), Documentos da Catedral de Lugo, (Santiago de Compostela, 1998)

6th-century Galician bishops